Gert Gustav Paul Jeschonnek (30 October 1912 – 18 April 1999) was an officer in the Kriegsmarine during World War II. Following World War II, he became commander (Inspector of the Navy) of the post-war German Navy.

References 
 Sander-Nagashima, Johannes Berthold (2006). Die Bundesmarine 1955 bis 1972: Konzeption und Aufbau. München, Germany: Oldenbourg Verlag. .

External links

1912 births
1999 deaths
Reichsmarine personnel
Kriegsmarine personnel of World War II
Bundesmarine admirals
Vice admirals of the German Navy
Knights Commander of the Order of Merit of the Federal Republic of Germany
Chiefs of Navy (Germany)